The Biscay Bar Association (officially Ilustre Colegio de la Abogacía de Bizkaia, in Spanish, and Bizkaiko Abokatuen Elkargo Ohoretsua, in Basque) is the professional association of lawyers of Biscay. It is the professional association of Biscay with which lawyers must be associated in order to practice law.

In Spain, in order for lawyers to practice law they must be in possession of the Professional Title of Lawyer and they must also be associated with a professional association of lawyers of Spain.

The association 

The Biscay Bar Association was founded on July 11, 1838, in the Bilbao City Council by call of Don José Javier de Goytia who was the first Dean of the professional association, for being the oldest lawyer in the town.

The Biscay Bar Association is the governing body of all the collegiate/associated lawyers in the circumscript of exercise of this professional association (Biscay) and has its headquarters in Bilbao. The current dean of the Association is Carlos Fuentenebro Zabala.

In Spain, in order for lawyers to practice law they must be in possession of the Professional Title of Lawyer (Título Profesional de Abogado), to get the title it is necessary to have a bachelor's degree in Law, a master's degree in Law and to pass the State Exam of Lawyers.

See also 

 Constitutional Court of Spain
 Supreme Court of Spain
 Royal Decree

References 

Government of Spain
Law of Spain
Spanish bar associations